Martín Alonso Heredia Lizárraga (born 9 January 1964) is a Mexican politician affiliated with the PAN. He currently serves as Deputy of the LXII Legislature of the Mexican Congress representing Sinaloa.

References

1964 births
Living people
People from Sinaloa
National Action Party (Mexico) politicians
21st-century Mexican politicians
Deputies of the LXII Legislature of Mexico
Members of the Chamber of Deputies (Mexico) for Sinaloa